"Eye of a Hurricane" is a song written by Jerry Fuller, and recorded by American country music artist John Anderson.  It was released in December 1984 as the third single and title track from the album Eye of a Hurricane.  The song reached number 20 on the Billboard Hot Country Singles & Tracks chart. Its B-side was "Chicken Truck", which was a Top 10 hit for Anderson in 1981.

Chart performance

References

1985 singles
1984 songs
John Anderson (musician) songs
Songs written by Jerry Fuller
Warner Records singles